The Vancouver Rugby Union (VRU) is the administrative body for rugby union in Vancouver, British Columbia, Canada. The VRU currently consists of 11 local rugby clubs and Seattle.

Members

External links
 BCRU Home Page
 VRU Homepage

Sport in Vancouver
Rugby union governing bodies in Canada
Rugby union in British Columbia